The Bartolini Tondo is a tempera on panel painting by Filippo Lippi. 135 cm in diameter, it is also known as Madonna with the Child and Scenes from the Life of St Anne or Madonna and Child with the Birth of the Virgin and the Meeting between St Joachim and St Anne. It is now in the Galleria Palatina in the Palazzo Pitti in Florence. The work is mentioned in the Palazzo Pitti inventories in 1761, which mention it as being stored or displayed in the "soffitte" or attics.

History
It has been traditionally dated to 1452-1453 and held to have been commissioned by Leonardo Bartolini of Florence early in the painter's stay in Florence, interpreting mentions in a number of documents as the work. However, more recent studies by Jeffrey Ruda interpret the coat of arms on the work's reverse as that of a member of the Martelli family and re-date it to between 1465 and 1470 by similarities to the artist's final frescoes in the Capella Maggiore at Prato Cathedral.

References

1450s paintings
Paintings of the Madonna and Child by Filippo Lippi
Paintings in the collection of the Galleria Palatina
Paintings of Saint Anne
Paintings of the Nativity of the Virgin
Paintings of Joachim